A Jazzed Honeymoon is a 1919 American short comedy film featuring Harold Lloyd. In this eight-minute short, a newly married couple have adventures on a steamship.

Cast
 Harold Lloyd as The Boy
 Snub Pollard
 Bebe Daniels
 Sammy Brooks
 Mildred Forbes
 Estelle Harrison
 Wallace Howe
 Bud Jamison
 Margaret Joslin
 Dee Lampton
 Gus Leonard
 Belle Mitchell
 Marie Mosquini
 James Parrott
 William Petterson
 Noah Young

See also
 Harold Lloyd filmography

References

External links
 
 

1919 films
Silent American comedy films
1919 short films
American silent short films
1919 comedy films
American black-and-white films
Films directed by Hal Roach
Films with screenplays by H. M. Walker
American comedy short films
1910s American films